Summit County is the name of three counties in the United States:

Summit County, Colorado
Summit County, Ohio
Summit County, Utah